The Huntington Boosters were a Middle Atlantic League (1931–1933) and Mountain State League (1937, 1939) minor league baseball team based in Huntington, West Virginia. It was affiliated with the Detroit Tigers in 1932 and 1933 and with the Brooklyn Dodgers in 1939. It was the first team to be based in Huntington since the Huntington Blue Sox of the Ohio State League disbanded in 1916. Baseball Hall of Fame inductee Walter Alston played for Huntington in 1936.

From 1934 to 1936, the team was known as the Huntington Red Birds and in 1938 it was known as the Huntington Bees. That year, it was managed by Dickey Kerr, while Mike Sandlock and Hank LaManna played for the team. It became the Huntington Aces in 1940. As the Aces, Sheriff Blake, Russ Young, Pee-Wee Wanninger and Ezra Midkiff each managed the team at some point, despite the team lasting only two seasons under that name. Of note, Cliff Fannin and Ken Wood, who both spent over half a decade in Major League Baseball, played the team when it was known as the Jewels.

Multiple major league players spent time with the team when it was called the Boosters, including 1945 All-Star second baseman Eddie Mayo. He was with the team in 1933.

Notable alumni

Baseball Hall of Fame alumni

 Walter Alston (1936) Inducted, 1983

MLB Alumni

 Rube Benton (1933)

 Sheriff Blake (1941)

 Cliff Fannin (1942)

 Orville Jorgens (1931)

 Dickey Kerr (1938)

 Marty Marion (1936) 8 x MLB all-Star; 1944 NL Most Valuable Player

 Eddie Mayo (1932) MLB All-Star

 Bernie Neis (1933)

Johnny Stuart (1931)

Ken Wood (1942)

References

Baseball teams established in 1931
Defunct minor league baseball teams
Professional baseball teams in West Virginia
Detroit Tigers minor league affiliates
Brooklyn Dodgers minor league affiliates
St. Louis Cardinals minor league affiliates
St. Louis Browns minor league affiliates
Mountain State League teams
Middle Atlantic League teams
Defunct baseball teams in West Virginia
1931 establishments in West Virginia
Sports in Huntington, West Virginia
1942 disestablishments in West Virginia
Baseball teams disestablished in 1942